Pieter Willemsz Verhoeff ( – 22 May 1609) was a Dutch admiral of the Admiralty of Amsterdam, notable for his voyage to Asia between 1607 and 1612.

Verhoeff was in the service of the Dutch East India Company. In 1601, he was involved in the Siege of Ostend. During the Battle of Gibraltar, in 1607, he was flag captain of the Aeolus, the flagship of Admiral Jacob van Heemskerk. 

He died during an expedition to Banda, where he and many of his crew were ambushed and murdered by natives of Banda Island while negotiating with them for the Dutch East India Company. This assassination was the direct cause of the Dutch conquest of the Banda Islands (1609–1621).

Footnotes

Bibliography 

 

1570s births
1609 deaths
Admirals of the navy of the Dutch Republic
History of Kerala
Sailors on ships of the Dutch East India Company